The Burwell Bridge was a historic bridge on the northern edge of Burwell in Garfield County, Nebraska which was built in 1940–41.  It was a steel girder bridge that brings Nebraska Highway 11 over the North Loup River.  It is also known as the North Loup River Bridge and denoted as NEHBS Number GFOO-13.  It was listed on the National Register of Historic Places in 1992, and was delisted in 2019.
 		 	
It was designed by the Nebraska Bureau of Roads & Bridges to replace the previous bridge which had been washed out by floodwaters on June 25, 1939. The bridge is at a 30 degree skew over the river. It has concrete abutments, wingwalls and spill-through piers. It has a concrete deck over steel stringers. It was built by contractor W.A. Biba Engineering Company of Geneva, Nebraska at cost of $44,763.28, using steel from Omaha Steel Works.

According to its NRHP registration, the bridge was deemed notable as one of "the longest cantilevered beam structures identified in the statewide bridge inventory. It is technologically significant for its representation of long-span beam bridge experimentation conducted by the state engineer's office in the 1930s."

By 2010, however, the bridge appeared to have been replaced by a new reinforced concrete and girder bridge. It has a concrete cast-in-place deck.

Notes

References

External links

Bridges on the National Register of Historic Places in Nebraska
Bridges completed in 1941
Buildings and structures in Garfield County, Nebraska
Transportation in Garfield County, Nebraska
Steel bridges in the United States
Cantilever bridges in the United States
Girder bridges in the United States
Road bridges in Nebraska
Former National Register of Historic Places in Nebraska